KODI (1400 AM) is a radio station broadcasting a news/talk format. Licensed to Cody, Wyoming, United States, the station is currently owned by the Big Horn Radio Network, a division of Legend Communications of Wyoming, LLC, and features programming from AP Radio, Fox Sports Radio and Westwood One News.

All five stations of the Big Horn Radio Network have their offices and studios located on Mountain View Drive in Cody. The KODI transmitter site is on Reservoir Drive, just west of the studios.

In 2016, the station added an FM translator on 96.7, broadcasting to Cody and the immediate area.

References

External links

ODI
News and talk radio stations in the United States
Radio stations established in 1947
Cody, Wyoming
1947 establishments in Wyoming